K36JH-D, virtual and UHF digital channel 36, is a low-powered Jewelry TV and RT America-affiliated television station licensed to Barstow, California, United States. It was an affiliate of Tele Vida Abundante. Founded on March 14, 2007, the station was owned by David Primm.

History

The station originally received an original construction permit to broadcast on channel 16 until October 19, 2007, when the station moved to channel 36 to prevent interference from public safety radio operations in Los Angeles County. The station was granted a special temporary authority license by the FCC until March 6, 2008, when the station became licensed.

In April 2015, the license was transferred from David Primm of San Francisco, California to Brent Gaddis of Apple Valley, California.

On March 1, 2017, K36JH ceased analog service and completed a digital flash cut and began DTV service from their Quartzsite Peak site with two standard definition channels, 36.1 and 36.2. The station was licensed for digital operation on March 28, 2017, and changed its call sign to K36JH-D.

Digital channels
The station's signal is multiplexed:

Programming on 36.1 is RT America. 36.6 is broadcasting a live camera view toward Victorville from the transmitter site pointed south toward Interstate 15 and the Victorville area.

References

External links
 Page for K36JH

Television channels and stations established in 2007
2007 establishments in California
Low-power television stations in the United States
36JH-D